Kchun-Kazmalyar is a rural locality (a selo) in Kabir-Kazmalyarsky Selsoviet, Magaramkentsky District, Republic of Dagestan, Russia. The population was 377 as of 2010. There are 13 streets.

Geography 
Kchun-Kazmalyar is located 26 km northeast of Magaramkent (the district's administrative centre) by road. Gazardkam-Kazmalyar and Kabir-Kazmalyar are the nearest rural localities.

Nationalities 
Lezgins live there.

References 

Rural localities in Magaramkentsky District